Blade Runner: Black Lotus is a Japanese–American CGI anime television series based on the Blade Runner franchise that aired from November 2021 to February 2022. It was a co-production between Crunchyroll and Adult Swim, in addition to being created in partnership with Alcon Television Group.

Plot
Black Lotus takes place in Los Angeles in 2032, 10 years into the aftermath of the Black Out 2022, but before 2036: Nexus Dawn, and centers on a female replicant protagonist. It also includes "familiar" characters from the Blade Runner universe.

Characters
Elle

A female replicant created for a secret and unknown purpose.
Joseph

A mysterious figure who owns a spare parts junkyard in Los Angeles.
Alani Davis

A fresh LAPD recruit.
Niander Wallace Jr.

Brilliant scientist working for his father.
Niander Wallace Sr.

Founder and CEO of the Wallace Corporation.
Marlowe

A deadly Blade Runner.
Josephine Grant

The wife of the police chief.
Earl Grant

Police Chief of the LAPD.
Doc Badger

A black market dealer.
Senator Bannister

A politician with strong feelings on replicant production.
Doctor M

A brilliant doctor and professor of medicine.
Hooper

A journalist in the pocket of the Wallace Corporation.
Selene

A replicant nightclub singer

Production and release
The anime was announced back in November 2018. The series was animated by Sola Digital Arts with Shinji Aramaki and Kenji Kamiyama serving as co-directors. Shinichirō Watanabe, director of Blade Runner Black Out 2022, served as a creative producer. It aired on Adult Swim's Toonami programming block in the United States from November 14, 2021 to February 6, 2022. Crunchyroll also streamed the series in Japanese with English subtitles.

Canada's Corus Entertainment announced at their June 2021 upfronts that the series would air in the Fall on Adult Swim Canada. It would later be confirmed that the series would air in simulcast with the U.S.

In July 2021, both Japanese and English casts were revealed along with the announcement of a planned panel for the virtual 2021 San Diego Comic-Con. The opening theme is "Feel You Now" by Alessia Cara.

Episode list

Music

Track listing

Reception
On Rotten Tomatoes, the series has a Tomatometer rating of 71% based on seven reviews.

Notes

References

External links
 
 
 

2021 anime television series debuts
Adult Swim original programming
American adult computer-animated television series
Androids in television
Anime with original screenplays
Blade Runner (franchise)
Crunchyroll anime
Sola Digital Arts
Television series by Sony Pictures Television
Toonami
Television series by Warner Bros. Television Studios